"Breaking" is a song by American alternative rock band, Anberlin, and the second single from their album New Surrender. The release date for the song was originally set for January 2009, then February 16, but was pushed back several more times due to the continued success of previous single "Feel Good Drag". The song officially impacted radio on June 29, 2009 and reached number 23 on the Alternative Songs chart. It has also reached number 37 on the U.S. Rock Songs chart.

Chart performance

References

2009 singles
Anberlin songs
Songs written by Butch Walker
2008 songs
Universal Republic Records singles
Song recordings produced by Neal Avron